Neil's Puppet Dreams is a web series created by The Jim Henson Company under its Henson Alternative banner and released on The Nerdist Channel. The series stars Neil Patrick Harris who helped to create the series.

Plot
This web series features Neil Patrick Harris who lives with his partner David Burtka. Neil sleeps a lot and has strange dreams featuring puppet characters. Neil opens each episode by directly telling the audience "Hi, I'm Neil. I sleep a lot and when I dream, I dream in puppet." He then promptly falls asleep and has a puppet dream.

Episodes
 The Lullabye (November 27, 2012) - Neil has a dream where he is falling through the sky in a dream world and a few puppets show up and sing a song to comfort him which only increases Neil's panic.
 Doctor's Office (December 4, 2012) - Neil visits a doctor named Dr. Mayfair (played by Nathan Fillion) to talk to him about the puppet dreams that he has been having lately. Neil falls asleep and dreams that he is visiting a puppet doctor named Dr. Feltman where his unique physiology causes a stir in the puppet medical community.
 The Restaurant (December 11, 2012) - Neil grapples with pushy customers and punny puns when he dreams that he is a waiter at a restaurant.
 To Catch a Puppeteer (December 18, 2012) - Neil's questionable dream moral gets him into a handful of trouble when Puppet Chris Hansen shows up in Neil's dream called "To Catch a Puppeteer."
 Dream Bump (January 8, 2013) - The dreams of Neil and David collide when David's dream consists of dancers, drag performers (played by Willam Belli and Detox Icunt), and an appearance by Joe Manganiello.
 Alien Abduction (January 16, 2013) - Neil dreams that he has been abducted by aliens and tries to get them to probe him.
 Bollywood (January 22, 2013) - While watching a Bollywood film with David, Neil falls asleep and dreams that he is in a Bollywood musical where he is in love with a cow named Bessie (voiced by Daniele Gaither).

Cast
 Neil Patrick Harris - Himself
 David Burtka - Himself

Puppeteers
 Brian Clark - Rabbit (ep. 1), Winky the Trouser Weasel (ep. 2), Puppet Chris Hansen (ep. 4), Alien (ep. 6)
 Nathan Danforth - Beaver (ep. 3), Vulture (ep. 3), Health Inspector Mouse (ep. 3), Turtle (ep. 7) 
 Brian Henson - Jumper (ep. 1)
 Donna Kimball - Doll (ep. 1), Female Nurse (ep. 2), Wife (ep. 3)
 Drew Massey - Squirrel (ep. 1), Male Nurse (ep. 2), Caveman Chef (ep. 3), Husband (ep. 3)
 Colleen Smith - Rabbit (ep. 1), AbbyCadable2 (ep. 4), Anne (ep. 5), Alien (ep. 6)
 Allan Trautman - Rabbit (ep. 1), Dr. Feltman (ep. 2), Monkey (ep. 3), Shelley Oceans as the Drag Queen (ep. 5), Alien (ep. 6)
 Victor Yerrid - Goat (ep. 1), Warthog (ep. 2), Old Man (ep. 3), Hot Dog (ep. 3), Alan (ep. 5)

Reception

Awards and nominations
In April 2013, Neil's Puppet Dreams was nominated for a Webby Award in the "Best Comedy: Long Form or Series" category.

External links
 Neil's Puppet Dreams on The Nerdist's YouTube channel 
 

American comedy web series
American LGBT-related web series
Nerdist Industries
2012 web series debuts
2013 web series endings
Web series featuring puppetry
YouTube original programming
Dreams in fiction